Pont Cardinet is a station on Line 14 of the Paris Métro located in the Batignolles neighbourhood of the 17th arrondissement. It was opened on 14 December 2020 as part of the extension to Mairie de Saint-Ouen and is located nearby to Pont Cardinet station.

Gallery

References

See also 
 Pont Cardinet station

Accessible Paris Métro stations
Paris Métro stations in the 17th arrondissement of Paris
Railway stations in France opened in 2020